Héctor Calcaño (born Héctor Calcagno, 1894–1969) was an Argentine film actor. He appeared in nearly 70 films between 1933 and 1968.

Filmography
Este cura (1968) - a.k.a. Operación San Antonio (Argentina)
La señora del intendente (1967) .... Mezadra -  a.k.a. Señora del intendente-de-Ombú-quemado, La (Argentina: complete title)
Escándalo en la familia (1967) - a.k.a. Scandal in the Family (International: English title)
Canuto Cañete, detective privado (1965) .... Zorrilla
Extraña ternura (1964) .... Señor Langoa
El Gordo Villanueva (1964)
La Cigarra no es un bicho (1964) .... Police Commissioner -  (France: dubbed version) - The Cicada Is Not an Insect (literal English title) - The Games Men Play (USA)
Cuando calienta el sol (1963)
La Chacota (1962)
La Maestra enamorada (1961)
La Procesión (1960)
The Candidate (1959)
La Hermosa mentira (1958)
Rosaura a las 10 (1958) - a.k.a. Rosaura at 10 o'clock (International: English title: literal title)
La Morocha (1958)
El Sonámbulo que quería dormir (1956)
La Dama del millón (1956) - a.k.a. Veinte metros de amor (Argentina)
Canario rojo (1955)
El Barro humano (1955) - a.k.a. The Human Clay (USA)
Concierto para una lágrima (1955)
El Millonario (1955)
Mi marido y mi novio (1955)
Su seguro servidor (1954)
Mujeres casadas (1954)
La Cueva de Ali-Babá (1954) - a.k.a. The Cave of Ali Baba (International: English title: literal title)
El Último cowboy (1954)
La Pasión desnuda (1953) - a.k.a. Naked Passion (International: English title)
Fin de mes (1953)
Payaso (1952)
The Earring (1951)
Concierto de bastón (1951)
Cuidado con las mujeres (1951)
La Mujer del león (1951)
Arroz con leche (1950) -  a.k.a. Rice and Milk (International: English title)
Ladrón canta boleros, El (1950)
Cita en las estrellas (1949)
Fascinación (1949) - a.k.a. Fascination (International: English title)
Hombre solo no vale nada, Un (1949)
Hostería del caballito blanco, La (1948) - a.k.a. White Horse Inn (International: English title)
Los Hijos del otro (1947)
El Retrato (1947)
La Casta Susana (1945) - a.k.a. Chaste Susan (International: English title)
La Importancia de ser ladrón (1944)
La Calle Corrientes (1943) - a.k.a. Locura del tango, La (Argentina)
Una Novia en apuros (1942) - a.k.a. A Bride in Trouble (International: English title)
Hay que casar an Ernesto (1941) - a.k.a. Ernest Must Be Married (International: English title)
La Hora de las sorpresas (1941) - a.k.a. Surprise Hour (International: English title)
Educating Niní (1940)
La Luz de un fósforo (1940)
El Susto que Perez se llevo (1940) - a.k.a. Lo que Perez se llevo (Argentina) - Pobre diablo, Un (Argentina)
Campeón por una mujer (1939)
The Intruder (1939)
Mi suegra es una fiera (1939)
El Sobretodo de Céspedes (1939)
El Hombre que nació dos veces (1938)
Adiós Buenos Aires (1938)
Cadetes de San Martín (1937) - a.k.a. Cadets of St. Martin (USA)
Compañeros (1936)
Canillita (1936)
El Conventillo de la paloma (1936)
Goal (1936)
El Alma de bandoneón (1935) - a.k.a. The Soul of the Accordion (USA)
Noches de Buenos Aires (1935) - a.k.a. Buenos Aires Nights (USA)
Picaflor (1935)
Mañana es domingo (1934) .... Gerente
Riachuelo (1934) - a.k.a. Brook (International: English title: literal title) (USA)
Dancing (1933)

External links
 

1894 births
1969 deaths
Argentine male film actors
Argentine people of Italian descent
Male actors from Buenos Aires